Keely Christinne Pinho Rodrigues Medeiros (born 30 April 1987) is a Brazilian athlete whose specialty is the shot put. She competed at the 2015 World Championships in Beijing without qualifying for the final. Her personal bests in the shot put are 17.58 metres outdoors (São Paulo 2014)  and 16.98 metres indoors (Lexington 2012). She also has a personal best of 54.91 metres set in Des Moines in 2011.

Competition record

References

External links
 

1987 births
Living people
Brazilian female shot putters
World Athletics Championships athletes for Brazil
Sportspeople from Goiás
Athletes (track and field) at the 2011 Pan American Games
South American Games bronze medalists for Brazil
South American Games medalists in athletics
Competitors at the 2006 South American Games
Competitors at the 2014 South American Games
Pan American Games athletes for Brazil